Biathlon debuted at the 1960 Winter Olympics in Squaw Valley, California with the men's 20 km individual event. At the 1968 Winter Olympics in Grenoble, the men's 4 × 7.5 km relay debuted, followed by the 10 km sprint event at the 1980 Winter Olympics in Lake Placid, New York. Beginning at the 1992 Winter Olympics in Albertville, women's biathlon debuted with the 15 km individual, 3 × 7.5 km relay (4 × 7.5 km during 1994-2002, and 4 × 6 km in 2006), and 7.5 km sprint. A pursuit race (12.5 km for men and 10 km for women) was included at the 2002 Winter Olympics in Salt Lake City. The top 60 finishers of the sprint race (10 km for men and 7.5 km for women) would qualify for the pursuit event. The sprint winner starts the race, followed by each successive biathlete at the same time interval they trailed the sprint winner in that event. At the 2006 Winter Olympics in Turin, a mass start (15 km for men and 12.5 km for women) was introduced where the top 30 biathletes from the previous four events were allowed to start together for the competition.

Prior to the biathlon debut at the 1960 Winter Olympics, there was a military patrol event that was held at four Winter Olympic Games: 1924, 1928, 1936, and 1948. Medals were awarded for military patrol in 1924, but it was a demonstration event for the other three Winter Games. The official website of the IOC now treats Men's Military Patrol at the 1924 Games as a separate discipline, without mixing it with the sports of Skiing or Biathlon. However, the 1924 Official Report treats it as an event within the sport of skiing.

Summary

Events

Men's
• = official event, (d) = demonstration event

Women's
• = official event, (d) = demonstration event

Mixed

Medal table 

Sources (after the 2022 Winter Olympics):
Accurate as of 2022 Winter Olympics.

Notes
 This table does not include medals of  1924 military patrol event, that the IOC now treats as a separate discipline.
 2 silver medals and no bronze were awarded at 2010 men's individual distance.

Number of biathletes by nation

See also
List of Olympic venues in biathlon
Biathlon rifle Anschütz 1827F

References

External links

 
Sports at the Winter Olympics
Recurring events established in 1960
Skiing at the Winter Olympics
Olympics